Michelle Cooper is a Scottish international bowls player who won a gold medal at the 2012 World Outdoor Bowls Championship. Cooper won the World U25 Mixed Pairs Championship at Gedling Indoor Bowling Club in Nottingham in 2010.

Personal life 
Cooper is from Kilwinning in North Ayrshire. Her parents are Alexander and Maureen.

In November 2016, Cooper was jailed for 8 months after admitting to stealing £61,000 from her parents' bank account because of a gambling addiction.

References

Scottish female bowls players
Living people
1986 births
Bowls World Champions
Bowls European Champions
21st-century Scottish criminals